Francis Erdmann of Saxe-Lauenburg (Theusing, 25 February 1629 – 30 July 1666, Schwarzenbek), was duke of Saxe-Lauenburg between 1665 and 1666. He was the eldest son of Duke Julius Henry and his second wife Elisabeth Sophia of Brandenburg, daughter of John George, Elector of Brandenburg.

Marriage
In 1654 Francis Erdmann married his half-cousin Sibylle Hedwig of Saxe-Lauenburg (30 July 1625 – 1 August 1703, Ratzeburg), daughter of Duke Augustus. Since their marriage remained without heir Francis Erdmann was succeeded by his half-brother Julius Francis.

Ancestry

Succession box
 

 

|-

1629 births
1666 deaths
Francis Erdmann
Francis Erdmann
German Bohemian people
People from Toužim